Andkjelvatnet is a lake that lies in the municipality of Sørfold in Nordland county, Norway. The water flows out through the Tørrfjordelva river into the Sørfolda fjord. Most of the water that would naturally flow into the lake from the lake Sisovatnet to the east is diverted to a hydroelectric power station on the lake Straumvatnet.

See also
 List of lakes in Norway
 Geography of Norway

References

Sørfold
Lakes of Nordland